In Britain, a cafe, also known colloquially as a caff or greasy spoon, is a small, cheap eatery typically specialising in fried foods or home-cooked meals.

Though it uses the same word origin as the term "café", it is distinct from the more European style of coffeehouse or bar. A British cafe does not usually serve alcohol. It is commonly an independently owned business; the only notable chain of roadside cafes is OK Diner since the demise of Happy Eater in 1997 and Little Chef in 2018.

Menu
A British cafe typically offers fried or grilled food such as an all-day "full cooked breakfast", which may contain a combination of ingredients such as fried egg, bacon, black pudding, bubble and squeak, hash browns, baked beans, fried bread, toast, grilled tomato, burgers, sausages, mushrooms and chips. Hot and cold sandwiches may be available, such as a bacon butty or sausage sandwich. A range of other cooked meals may be available, such as steak and kidney pie, a full roast, or liver and onions, with a cooked dessert such as apple crumble and custard.

The main drink in a cafe or greasy spoon is usually tea, especially "builder's tea" (a nickname for a mug of strong black tea, such as English breakfast tea, usually served with milk and sugar and typically robust and flavourful with a brisk character and a dark red colour). Coffee, where available, is usually instant or sometimes espresso but rarely brewed.

Transport cafe
The cafe was the mainstay of British lorry drivers who travelled the major trunk roads such as the A1 and the A6 prior to the opening of the motorways. These cafes were not only stops where the driver could eat, but also made convenient meeting places where the trade unions could talk to their members. A cafe that is beside a main road and serves passing motorists, particularly lorry drivers, is sometimes known as a transport cafe; this may or not be accompanied by a petrol station. A motorway service station will typically include one or more fast food restaurants such as Burger King, Greggs, or McDonald's, and possibly a transport cafe for the lorry drivers.

See also

 Ace Cafe, a historic transport cafe
 AMT Coffee
 The Armadillo Tea Rooms
 Bar Italia
 Boston Tea Party (café chain)
 British Coffee House
 Button's Coffee House
 Cadena Cafes Limited
 Café Monico
 Caffè Concerto
 Caffè Nero
 Caffè Ritazza
 Café Scientifique
 Carpenter's Coffee House
 The Cat's Whisker
 Cave Austin and Company
 Cereal Killer Cafe
 Coffee 1
 Coffee Republic
 Costa Coffee
 Cyberia, London
 Forest Café
 Freeth's Coffee House
 Freud, Oxford
 Gail's
 Garraway's Coffee House
 Grecian Coffee House
 Harris + Hoole
 Hindoostane Coffee House
 Hotel Café Royal
 InSpiral Lounge
 The Jazz Café
 Jonathan's Coffee-House
 Kardomah Cafés
 Labworth Café
 Lloyd's Coffee House
 Magpie Café
 Minerva Café
 Muffin Break
 Nando's Coffee House
 Old Slaughter's Coffee House
 Ossington Coffee Tavern, Newark on Trent
 Partisan Coffee House
 Patisserie Valerie
 Pete's Eats Cafe
 Pink Peacock
 Pumpkin Café Shop
 Queen's Lane Coffee House
 Rainbow Coffee House
 Regency Cafe
 The River Café
 Sun Inn, Barnes
 Taylor St Baristas
 Tom King's Coffee House
 Trew Era Cafe
 The Troubadour, London
 Turkey Cafe
 Union Street Café
 Vienna Café
 Will's Coffee House

References

External links
 Classic Cafes – The Very Best of London's Twentieth Century vintage Formica caffs

Hospitality industry in the United Kingdom
Restaurants by type